Amram Ducovny (September 11, 1927 – August 23, 2003) was an American non-fiction writer, playwright and novelist.

Life and career
Ducovny, born as Duchovny, was born and raised in the New York City area. His family was Jewish. His father, Moshe Duchovny, who came to the United States in 1918 from Berdychiv, Russian Empire (now in Ukraine), was a noted Yiddish writer and journalist, who wrote for the Morning Journal, among other publications. His mother, Julia, was an immigrant from Poland. Ducovny dropped the "h" in his last name to avoid its mispronunciations.

He graduated from New Utrecht High School and received a B.A. from New York University. First, he worked in public relations for the American Jewish Committee in New York, and until his retirement for the Combined Jewish Philanthropies of Boston. In 1977, he moved to Boston and became director of public affairs for Brandeis University. From 1978 to 1982, he was the vice president for public affairs at the university.

Around 1964, he started his writing career. He wrote ten nonfiction books and a play The Trial of Lee Harvey Oswald that was brought into Broadway in 1967, and was soon thereafter adapted for television. In 2001, Ducovny fulfilled his lifelong dream and published a novel, Coney, which received several positive reviews. It was based on his early experiences as the child of Jewish immigrants before World War II. In 2003, Ducovny died from heart disease in Paris, where he lived. He was 75 years old.

He had three children with his first wife, Margaret: Daniel, actor and writer David, and Laurie. He was married to his second wife, Varda, from 1972 until his death in 2003.

Bibliography
 Bobby Kennedy's New York (1964)
 How to Shoot a Jewish Western (1965)
 The establishment dictionary: From Agnew to Zsa Zsa (1966)
 The Trial of Lee Harvey Oswald (1967)
 The Billion Dollar Swindle: Frauds Against the Elderly (1969)
 The Wisdom of Spiro T. Agnew (1969) (with Peter Green)
 David Ben-Gurion, in his own words (1969)
 I'm in bed with the President, and Mao Tse Tung is knocking at the door (the American dream of an American girl) (1971)
 Catalog of fantastic things, americanized by Amram M. Ducovny (1971) (with Jacques Carelman)
 I Want to Make One Thing Perfectly Clear (1972)
 Coney (2001)
 Coney Island Kid (2002) (with Pierre Guglielmina)

References

External links

 www.amazon.com
 varda-ducovny.com

1927 births
2003 deaths
20th-century American dramatists and playwrights
American people of Polish-Jewish descent
American people of Ukrainian-Jewish descent
American male novelists
Jewish American dramatists and playwrights
New York University alumni
Novelists from New York (state)
20th-century American male writers
20th-century American non-fiction writers
American male non-fiction writers
New Utrecht High School alumni